The Team (also known in  French as L'Équipe) is an international multi-ethnic and multicultural television series produced by Search for Common Ground (SFCG). It is a flagship television program by SFCG, used as an education tool through a dramatization of various young players associated to each other through their common love of association football (soccer).

The common thread between all the series is promote, through the common love of the game of football (soccer), the importance of education, commitment, cooperation (teamwork), diversity, gender equality, overcoming of adversity and conflict resolution and bridging of differences between people of various ethnic, religious, economic and societal backgrounds by bringing them together.

Context
Using the popularity of football (called soccer in America), the show uses sports as a metaphor to unification while addressing local, deep-rooted conflict. The show follows specific characters on a football team who must learn to work together to overcome their differences and win the game. The show is specifically tailored to the country in which it airs. Each country has different issues it faces, and the scripts represent these differences. The cast, writers and production crews are, whenever possible, all indigenous to the country. In the DRC, The Team deals specifically with women's rights.

Part of the success of The Team is that the audience can relate to the characters. The characters portrayed on the soap opera are from varied ethnic, religious, educational and economic backgrounds.

The Team aired in a dozen countries in Asia, Africa and the Middle East, notably Ivory Coast, Kenya, Morocco and had already aired as a radio program in Ethiopia. Second seasons were in production in three countries. According to the Boston Globe, nearly 25% of Moroccans watch the locally produced episodes of The Team.

In 2007, Kenya experienced post-election violence. In response to this violence, SFCG, in partnership with the Nairobi Peace Initiative, Media Focus on Africa, the UK's Department for International Development and the US Agency for International Development, launched The Team: Kenya The show follows players from the Imani F.C. team. Imani translates as Faith in the local language. The players are from all different parts of Kenyan society- rich and poor, educated and uneducated, urban and rural and male and female. The players have to work together to win games, and through working together, they overcome their differences. The show originally broadcast in May, 2009. A third season is currently in production.

Series

Many series have been broadcast or are in process of being broadcast in local television stations in Africa, Asia and the Middle East. Each series usually consists of between 10 and 13 episodes as a television soap opera series. Some broadcasters, owing to the success of the initial series have announced new episodes in a renewed season.  There was also a 50-episode radio version in Ethiopia

References

External links
The Team page on Search for Common Ground website
The Team Common trailer - from various country versions
Lebanon: The Team Lebanon
Nepal: Hamro Team Nepal

2010s French television series
Association football television series